Jean du Thiers, seigneur de Beauvoir (died 1559) was  Minister of Finance for Henry II of France, and a Secretary of State.

He was a great humanist and protector of the poet Joachim du Bellay and Pierre de Ronsard.

He bought the Château de Beauregard, Loire Valley, in 1545, for 2,000 gold ecus.
Jean du Thiers was the real builder of the castle. He incorporated the old house in the new building and built in Renaissance style, the central gallery which connected the two buildings.

From 1553, he appealed to many foreign artists who were working for King Henry II. The painter Nicolò dell'Abbate decorated it with frescoes. Francesco Scibec da Carpi carved woodwork of the study, "the Cabinet of Jingle Bells" at the foot of the windows of the south wing.  He showed a collections of rare plants.

References

French Foreign Ministers
1567 deaths
1510 births
16th-century French diplomats
French Ministers of Finance
Court of Henry II of France